Kemmis is a surname and a masculine given name of British origin. Notable people with the name include:

Surname
Anchilee Scott-Kemmis (born 1999) Thai-Australian model
Daniel Kemmis (born 1945), American author and politician
James Kemmis (1751–1820), British Army officer 
John Kemmis (1867–1942), Canadian politician

Given name
Arthur Kemmis Betty (1877–1961), British Royal Navy officer

Surnames of English origin